ITA Award for Best Actress in a Supporting Role is an award given by Indian Television Academy Awards as a part of its annual event for TV serials, to recognize a female actor who has delivered an outstanding performance in a Supporting Role.

Winners

References 

best actress supporting
Television awards for Best Actress